The Consenting Adult Sex Bill (Assembly Bill 489) is a consenting adult law, passed in California in 1975 and effective in January 1976, that repealed the sodomy law in California so that it applied only in criminal situations and made gay sex legal for the first time. George Moscone, an early proponent of gay rights, in conjunction with his friend and ally in the Assembly, Willie Brown, managed to get the bill passed, 21-20, repealing the existing Californian laws against sodomy. The amendment was signed into law by California Governor Jerry Brown. The Assembly had a much easier time passing the bill, with final vote on AB 489 being 45-26. Gov. Brown signed the bill on May 12, 1975.

Assemblyman Brown introduced the bill in 1970, resulting in a five-year fight in the legislature.

History 
During the late 19th and early 20th centuries, sodomy was often considered a “crime against nature” due to the fact that engaging in this form of intercourse disallows any possibility for procreation. Sodomy is defined as being "sexual contact that takes place between the penis of one person and the anus of another person." These laws were extended by state legislation to include oral sex performed on a man or a woman. Observations were then made on the people who committed the crime and the majority of offenders did such acts with minors. Despite improvements on laws protecting minors in cases of molestation, sodomy was still the primary charge.

Assembly Bill 489 
The bill decriminalized sex that is non-procreational and protected minors who could not legally consent. The 1975 California bill states, "This bill removes criminal sanctions from adulterous cohabitation; and it removes specific criminal sanctions from sodomy and oral copulation except: (1) when the sodomy or oral copulation is committed with a minor or by force, violence, duress, menace or threat of great bodily harm." The focus was then set by Brown and Moscone to be on the consent of the adult for the sexual act and not the act itself.

Legal precedents

Bowers v. Hardwick 

In Georgia in 1986, two men were walked in on while engaging in consensual sodomy in the privacy of a home. Hardwick, the respondent, took the case to the Court of Appeals after the Federal District Court denied his challenging of the constitutionality of the sodomy laws. After judgment, it was decided that since not all Court of Appeals had the same ruling over Hardwick’s claim, the matter at hand is whether or not Federal Constitution holds a fundamental right for homosexuals to engage in sodomy (source).

Hardwick felt like he was set up for failure as a “practicing homosexual.” From precedent, the Due Process Law of the Fourteenth Amendment did not extend to private acts in the home for his case. In the end, the rulings of the Appeals Court were reversed.

Lawrence v. Texas 

In Texas, 2003, two men were caught engaging in sodomy under the reporting of a gun shooting disturbance. The Bowers v. Hardwick case was re-examined because there were more liberties uncounted for. The US Supreme Court documents the claim:

"To say that the issue in Bowers was simply the right to engage in certain sexual conduct demeans the claim the individual put forward, just as it would demean a married couple were it said that marriage is just about the right to have sexual intercourse."

This case brought to light the right to choose what relationships to engage in as a free adult in the sanctity of their own homes.

Following the Hardwick case, the states that had laws prohibiting sodomy had dropped from 25 to 13 while 4 of those states only enforce these laws against homosexuals. This fact was used in order to prove that the Bowers’ ruling was constructed on the largely accepted values of the nation at the time.

Finally, The Due Process Law of the Fourteenth Amendment was effective in preventing the government from intruding in the personal lives of citizens.

Modern-Day California: Penal Code 286 
The California Penal Code 286 still punishes for sodomy under the following circumstances:

 Act is done with someone under the age of 18 (a minor)
 Done through violent force, fear tactics, or manipulation
 Done on someone who is:
 Intoxicated / under the influence of drugs and therefore unable to consent for a sexual act
 Diagnosed with a physical or mental disability, in which the perpetrator is aware of,  that would cause him or her to be unable to consent 
Uninformed of the type of sexual act that was to be engaged in or was asleep

These guidelines are in place in order for anyone to be justifiably accused of unlawful sodomy and/or rape. They do not discriminate against people according to their sexual preferences or sexual orientation. The consequences for an illegal act of sodomy are defined in Assembly Bill 489: "This bill increases the punishment to not less than three years state imprisonment in cases of sodomy by force, violence, duress, menace or threat of great bodily harm, and in cases where the other person is 14 years of age and 10 years younger than the defendant. If the sodomy is with a person under 18, sodomy is punishable under the bill as a felony-misdemeanor by imprisonment in state prison for not more than 15 years or in the county jail for not more than one year."

See also

1975 in LGBT rights
1976 in LGBT rights

References

Bibliography

(May 14, 1975). "Gov. Brown Signs Bill Legalizing All Sex Acts." Los Angeles Times.
Woods, William and Diane Binson (2003). Bay Bathhouses and Public Health Policy. Binghamton: Haworth Press.

LGBT law in California
1975 in LGBT history
LGBT history in California
History of LGBT civil rights in the United States
Politics of the San Francisco Bay Area
California statutes